The thirteenth season of the American game show television series American Ninja Warrior premiered on May 31, 2021 on NBC. The season contain 12 episodes. A spin-off from the Japanese reality series Sasuke, it is hosted by Matt Iseman, Akbar Gbaja-Biamila, and Zuri Hall. As with the twelfth season, this season used a smaller number of filming locations with no audiences during taping due to the COVID-19 pandemic.

The series was announced in November 2020, a few weeks after the previous season finished airing. Applications were officially being accepted that month. The series was also a full season, as opposed to the shortened, 8-episode season seen in 2020 due to the COVID-19 pandemic. Filming took place entirely in Seattle/Tacoma and Los Angeles, California, with the national finals filming back in Las Vegas, Nevada. The Grand Prize and the Last Ninja Standing reward were restored, as $1,000,000 and $100,000, respectively. Kaden Lebsack, 15, was Last Ninja Standing, winning the $100,000 first prize after narrowly missing out on the grand prize in the rope climb.

Starting with this season, the age requirement dropped from 19 years old to 15. Competitors also included "family" teams of three, with at least one teenager 15 to 19 years old, with each member competing on two obstacles. Filming for the season began in March 2021 and casting took place between November 22 to December 14, 2020. The full cast of competitors was announced in January 2021. The season introduced "Split Decision", in which competitors could choose one of two obstacles to do for the third obstacle in qualifying courses and the ninth obstacle in semifinal courses. In the National Finals, Split Decision occurred on the eighth and final obstacle of Stage One.

Obstacles

Seattle/Tacoma Qualifying

Los Angeles Semifinals

Las Vegas National Finals

Bold indicates Split-Decision obstacles and completing the Mega Wall awarded $10,000 to the competitor.

Seattle/Tacoma Qualifying
The qualifiers took place at the Tacoma Dome in Tacoma, Washington. Athletes who conquered the 18-foot Mega Wall in bold and women who finished in the top 30 in italics.

Night 1

The first qualifying round featured three new obstacles: Overpass, Tipping Point, and V Formation, along with 'Split-Decision' (Domino Effect & Spinning Log). Notable ninjas running the course included NASCAR driver Jade Buford, two-time Olympic basketball gold medalist Ruthie Bolton, and 2008 Olympic gymnast Jonathan Horton was back for his 6th season.

This episode set a record for the fewest finishers in a qualifying episode, with only 5. Notable ninjas who did not advance were Mathis "Kid" Owhadi, Thomas Stillings, Barclay Stockett (who returned after missing season 12), Maggi Thorne, Jeri D’Aurelio, Casey Shuchocki, Nate Burkhalter, Quest O’Neal, John Loobey, and Ben Wilson.

Night 2

The second qualifying round featured the same course as the first qualifier, but with two new Split-Decision obstacles: Broken Bridge and Burn Rubber. Overpass was switched out with Weight For It from season 12. Notable ninjas running the course were former Olympic hurdler David "Crush" Payne and Alex Weber, the host of American Ninja Warrior: Crashing the Course award-winning web-series.

This was also the first time in the show's history where 5 women finished in the Top 30. Also, "The Weatherman" Joe Moravsky was the first to make it up the 18-foot Mega Wall this season.

Night 3

In this episode, two new obstacles were introduced: Air Surfer and Pretzel Twist. Notable ninjas running the course were former Olympic speed skater K.C. Boutiette, freestyle motocross rider Zach DiPaolo, and former pro wakeboarder Austin Hair. Two rookies, 19-year-old Brett Hernandez Strong and 16-year-old Vance Walker (a two-time American Ninja Warrior Junior winner), both scaled the Mega Wall.

Notable ninjas who didn't advance were Grant McCartney ("Island Ninja"), Nick Hanson ("Eskimo Ninja"), one half of the "Towers of Power" Brandon Mears, who after falling on his fifth balance obstacle in the past five seasons, announced his possible retirement, Bootie Coothran, Grace Sims, and Michelle Warnky Buurma after falling in the 3rd obstacle.

Night 4

Another new obstacle was introduced, called Double Down. Notable ninjas running the course were super-lightweight champion professional boxer Melissa St. Vil, former NFL player Andrew East (trained by his wife, Olympic gold-medal gymnast Shawn Johnson), and PLL lacrosse player Rob Pannell. However, schoolteacher Allyssa Beird was among the notable competitors who failed to advance to the semifinals.

With Lorin Ball absent for season 13, veterans David Campbell and Brian Kretsch became the only two competitors to have appeared on every single season of American Ninja Warrior.
 
Additionally, this was the only the second time five women made the top 30.

Night 5

Another new obstacle was introduced, this one called Tilt-A-Whirl. Among the notable ninjas was former NFL quarterback Jake Heaps. Brian Beckstrand and his son, Kai (who previously competed on American Ninja Warrior Junior), became the first ever father-and-son duo to hit the buzzer in the qualifying round. The "Cat Daddy", Jackson Twait, made it up the Mega Wall. Jesse "Flex" Labreck joined Meagan Martin as one of only two women to hit a buzzer in the qualifying round this season. One competitor from this episode, Nick Hanson (who made it to Sideways), is a different Nick Hanson from the "Eskimo Ninja"; his nickname is the "Rugby Ninja".

Among the notable veteran ninjas not advancing to the semifinals was Labreck’s fiancé, Chris DiGangi, as well as Michael Torres.

Seattle/Tacoma Qualifying Leaderboard

Los Angeles Semifinals
The show moved to Los Angeles, California for the semifinals, which took place on the lot of Universal Studios Hollywood. The Power Tower returned here, where the top two finishers would face off for the chance to win a Safety Pass (which would allow for a do-over of stage 1 or 2 of the Finals if necessary). Women in the top 15 italics.

Night 1

Two new obstacles were introduced, the first of which was the 5th obstacle, called Wall to Wall. Split Decision was moved to the back half of the course as the 9th obstacle, and here, competitors had a choice between another new obstacle, an upper-body obstacle called the Inverter, or a balance obstacle, the Tuning Forks.

 *Following the taping of this episode, but before the Finals in Las Vegas, Daniel Gil withdrew as a result of a positive coronavirus test and was unable to participate in the finals.  Jody Avila, the sixteenth place player, was added.  Coincidentally, Avila won an unaired Power Tower in season 12 that did not air because of a federal investigation involving , who achieved Total Victory in season 11.

Night 2

Another new obstacle was introduced in the back half of the course, Padlock.

Night 3

Another new obstacle was introduced, Drop Zone. Split Decision had two other obstacles: The Dungeon or Diving Boards.

Night 4
A record-breaking number of 12 athletes hit a semifinals buzzer tonight. Some notable competitors like Joe Brown and Flip Rodriguez, didn't move on to the National Finals. Jake Murray, put the fastest time for the second year in a row in a semifinal round, despite a loss on the Power Tower against Austin Gray. Also, since no woman competitor has completed the course, Jesse Labreck, as the final runner, kept the streak alive, by becoming the only woman to clear the extended course.

Los Angeles Semifinals Leaderboard

Las Vegas National Finals 

Slide Surfer, Swinging Blades, and Dipping Birds were introduced. Split Decision was a choice between The High Road or Fly Hooks, the final Stage 1 obstacle.

Stage 1
A total of 27 competitors finished Stage 1. Jesse Labreck, who fell three times in the last obstacle of Stage 1, got revenge and became the third woman ever to advance to Stage 2. Meanwhile, Jake Murray had the fastest time on Stage 1 for the third time. Joe Moravsky fell on The High Road on his first attempt, but thanks to the Safety Pass, he completed Stage 1 on his second try.

|-

Stage 2
Striding Steps, Double Salmon Ladder (after 8 years of absence), Hammer Drop, and Epic Air Surfer were introduced on Stage 2. Split Decision was not included past Stage 1.

Stage 3
15-year old Kaden Lebsack became the first rookie ever to complete Stage 3, as well as the first teenager and the fifth competitor passed overall. At that time, he already secured a cash prize.

Stage 4

Ratings

References

External links
 Season 13 on IMDb

American Ninja Warrior
2021 American television seasons